Qira is a Palestinian town located in the Salfit Governorate in the northern West Bank, 19 kilometers southwest of Nablus. According to the Palestinian Central Bureau of Statistics, it had a population of approximately 1,143 in 2007.

Location

History
Pottery sherds from the Iron Age I - II, Persian, Hellenistic/Roman have been found here, as has sherds from the   Byzantine and Crusader/Ayyubid  eras.

During the Crusader period, Diya' al-Din (1173–1245) writes that there was a Muslim population in the village. He also noted  that followers of Ibn Qudamah lived here.

Sherds from the Mamluk era have also been found here.

Ottoman era
The population was 8 households and 1 bachelor, all Muslim. They paid a  fixed  tax rate of 33,3% on agricultural products, such as  wheat, barley, summer crops, olive trees, goats and beehives and a press for olive oil or grape syrup, in addition to occasional revenues and a fixed tax for people of Nablus area; a total of 2,000 akçe. Sherds from the early Ottoman era have been found here.

In 1838, Edward Robinson noted it as a village, Kireh,  in the Jurat Merda district, south of Nablus.

In 1870, Victor Guérin noted Kireh on a hill partly covered with olives, and  having "barely a hundred and forty inhabitants".

In 1882, the Palestine Exploration Fund's  Survey of Western Palestine described Kireh as: "A moderate village on high ground, with a chapel venerated by the Moslems, but named after the Virgin Mary. The water supply is from a pool.

British Mandate era
In the  1922 census of Palestine conducted by the British Mandate authorities, Qireh  had a population of 87 Muslims, increasing in the 1931 census  to 102 Muslims in 28 occupied houses. 

In the 1945 statistics the population was 140 Muslims while the total land area was 2,249 dunams, according to an official land and population survey. Of this,  475  were allocated for plantations and irrigable land, 1,145 for cereals, while 14 dunams were classified as built-up areas.

Jordanian era
In the wake of the 1948 Arab–Israeli War, and after the 1949 Armistice Agreements, Qira came  under Jordanian rule.

The Jordanian census of 1961 found 259 inhabitants.

Post-1967
Since the Six-Day War in 1967,  Qira has been under  Israeli occupation. 

After the 1995 accords, 97.6 % of village land is defined as Area B land, while the remaining 2.4 % is Area C. The Segregation Wall established around Ariel settlement  isolates Qira from Salfit  and neighboring villages, leading Qira residents to take alternative longer routes to reach Salfit.

Settlers' attacks 
Qira has been the target of violence by Israeli settlers from nearby Jewish settlements. In January 2022, Palestinian cars were vandalized in the area, with perpetrators spray-painting Stars of David on the vehicles and puncturing their tires.

References

Bibliography

External links
 Welcome To Qira
Survey of Western Palestine, Map 14:  IAA, Wikimedia commons 
Qira Village (Fact Sheet), Applied Research Institute–Jerusalem (ARIJ)
Qira Village Profile, ARIJ
 Qira aerial photo, ARIJ
Development Priorities and Needs in Qira, ARIJ

Towns in Salfit Governorate
Salfit Governorate
Municipalities of the State of Palestine